The 1964 United States House of Representatives elections in South Carolina were held on November 3, 1964 to select six Representatives for two-year terms from the state of South Carolina.  The primary elections were held on June 9 and the runoff elections were held two weeks later on June 23.  All five incumbents who ran were re-elected and the open seat in the 5th congressional district was retained by the Democrats.  The composition of the state delegation thus remained solely Democratic.

1st congressional district
Incumbent Democratic Congressman L. Mendel Rivers of the 1st congressional district, in office since 1941, was unopposed in his bid for re-election.

General election results

|-
| 
| colspan=5 |Democratic hold
|-

2nd congressional district
Incumbent Democratic Congressman Albert Watson of the 2nd congressional district in office since 1963, was unopposed in his bid for re-election.

General election results

|-
| 
| colspan=5 |Democratic hold
|-

3rd congressional district
Incumbent Democratic Congressman William Jennings Bryan Dorn of the 3rd congressional district, in office since 1951, won the Democratic primary and was unopposed in his bid for re-election.

Democratic primary

General election results

|-
| 
| colspan=5 |Democratic hold
|-

4th congressional district
Incumbent Democratic Congressman Robert T. Ashmore of the 4th congressional district, in office since 1953, won the Democratic primary and was unopposed in the general election.

Democratic primary

General election results

|-
| 
| colspan=5 |Democratic hold
|-

5th congressional district
Incumbent Democratic Congressman Robert W. Hemphill of the 5th congressional district, in office since 1957, opted to retire. Thomas S. Gettys won the Democratic primary and defeated Republican challenger Robert M. Doster in the general election.

Democratic primary

General election results

|-
| 
| colspan=5 |Democratic hold
|-

6th congressional district
Incumbent Democratic Congressman John L. McMillan of the 6th congressional district, in office since 1939, defeated Republican challenger E. R. Kirkland.

General election results

|-
| 
| colspan=5 |Democratic hold
|-

See also
United States House elections, 1964
South Carolina's congressional districts

Sources

Info

South Carolina
United States House of Representatives
1964